The 1977 Jacksonville State Gamecocks football team represented Jacksonville State University as a member of the Gulf South Conference (GSC) during the 1977 NCAA Division II football season. Led by first-year head coach Jim Fuller, the Gamecocks compiled an overall record of 11–3 with a mark of 7–1 in conference play, and finished as GSC champion. In the playoffs, Jacksonville State advanced to the Championship Game where they were defeated by Lehigh.

Schedule

References

Jacksonville State
Jacksonville State Gamecocks football seasons
Gulf South Conference football champion seasons
Jacksonville State Gamecocks football